Masinton Pasaribu (born 11 February 1971) is an Indonesian politician from PDI-P and former activist who is a member of the People's Representative Council.

Career
Pasaribu was born in the city of Sibolga, North Sumatra from a Batak background. After completing high school, he spent some time as a freelance laborer at the Port of Belawan before moving to Jakarta to study law, graduating in 2003. During his time as a student, he was active in organisations protesting the New Order and took part in the 1998 protests which eventually led to the fall of Suharto. After graduating, he was also part of labor activism. Pasaribu joined PDI-P, along with around 50 other activists, in 2004. There, he became one of the founders and served as chairman of REPDEM ("Volunteers for Democratic Struggle"), which became one of PDI-P's wings.

In the 2014 Indonesian legislative election, Pasaribu ran for a seat in the People's Representative Council from Jakarta's 2nd electoral district and won after securing 30,989 votes. In the body, he became part of the third commission on law and human rights.

He attacked sitting vice president Jusuf Kalla in 2015, accusing him of being the source of various government issues. During an investigation into the Corruption Eradication Commission (KPK), Pasaribu became the deputy chairman of the committee responsible for some time, until he was replaced. Regarding the #2019GantiPresiden movement, Pasaribu called it a dishonest, political movement.

References

Living people
1971 births
Politicians from Jakarta
People of Batak descent
Indonesian Democratic Party of Struggle politicians
People from Sibolga
Members of the People's Representative Council, 2014
Members of the People's Representative Council, 2019